Allan Robin Winston Hancox (1932 – 1 January 2013) was a Chief Justice of Kenya. He served between 1989 and 1993, and was succeeded by Fred Kwasi Apaloo.

Early career
Born and educated in England, Justice Hancox first joined the judiciary as a magistrate in Kenya Colony in 1957. He subsequently worked in Nigeria, before returning to Kenya in 1963 as a senior resident magistrate. In 1969, he was appointed a High Court Judge.

Hancox Commission

In 1986 the then President Daniel arap Moi appointed Justice Hancox as the only member of a Commission Inquiring into the Insurance Industry.

Retirement and death
He retired to live in Guernsey and became Assistant Magistrate for ten years. He died aged 80 years at the Aga Khan hospital in the town of Kisumu.

See also
 Chief Justice of Kenya
 Court of Appeal of Kenya
 High Court of Kenya

References

1932 births
2013 deaths
20th-century Kenyan judges
British emigrants to Kenya
Kenyan expatriates in Nigeria
Chief justices of Kenya